Odostomia fuijitanii is a species of sea snail, a marine gastropod mollusc in the family Pyramidellidae, the pyrams and their allies.

Habitat
This species is found in the following habitats:
 Brackish
 Marine

References

External links
 To World Register of Marine Species

fuijitanii
Gastropods described in 1927